Lázaro Francisco y Angeles, also known as Lazaro A. Francisco (February 22, 1898 – June 17, 1980) was a Filipino novelist, essayist and playwright. Francisco was posthumously named a National Artist of the Philippines for Literature in 2009.

Biography 
Lazaro Francisco was born on February 22, 1898, to Eulogio Francisco and Clara Angeles, in Orani, Bataan. He spent his childhood years in Cabanatuan, Nueva Ecija. He took his college education at the Central Luzon Agricultural College (now Central Luzon State University), but was not able to finish due to poverty. He became a messenger of the Provincial Treasurer's Office of Nueva Ecija. Later on, he took third degree civil service examination where he qualified to become an assessor of the provincial government of Nueva Ecija.

He started writing in 1925, with five of his novels took him to fame. Being an assessor in an agricultural province, most of his writings were focused on small farmers and their current conditions with foreign businessmen. This lead him to win separate awards from Commonwealth Literary Contest in 1940 and 1946, for his masterpieces, Singsing na Pangkasal and Tatsulok, respectively.

In 1958, he established the Kapatiran ng mga Alagad ng Wikang Pilipino, roughly translated as "Brotherhood of the Disciples of the Filipino Language", a society that campaigned the use of Tagalog as the national language of the Philippines.

He received other distinguished awards and accolades in literature in his lifetime, including the Balagtas Award (1969), the Republic Cultural Heritage Award (1970) and the Patnubay ng Sining at Kalinangan Award from the government of Manila.

In 2009, former president Gloria Macapagal Arroyo awarded the National Artist of the Philippines for Literature to Francisco, posthumously, for his significant contribution to Philippine literature.

Major works 
The following are the major works of Lazaro Francisco:

Novels 

 Binhi at Bunga (Seed and Fruit), 1925
 Cesar, 1926
 Ama (Father), 1929 - translated to French by poet Jean-Paul Potet as Maître Tace (Master Tace).
 Bayang Nagpatiwakal (Country That Committed Suicide), 1931-1932
 Sa Paanan ng Krus (At the Cross' Foot), 1934
 Ang Pamana ng Pulubi (Beggar's Heritage), 1935
 Bago Lumubog ang Araw (Before the Sun Sets), 1936
 Singsing na Pangkasal (Wedding Ring), 1939-1940
 Tatsulok (Triangle), 1946
 Ilaw sa Hilaga (North Light), 1946-1947
 Sugat ng Alaala (Wound of Memory), 1951
 Maganda pa ang Daigdig (The World is Still Beautiful), 1956
 Daluyong (Wave), 1961

Except Bayang Nagpatiwakal, all of his works were published in Liwayway, a weekly magazine published in Tagalog language.

Short stories 

 Deo, 1927
 Ang Beterano (The Veteran), 1931
 Ang Idolo (The Idol), 1932
 Ang Pagtitika (Persistence), 1932
 Utos-Hari (King's Command), 1932
 Puwit ng Baso (Glass Bottom), 1932
 Kapulungan ng mga Pinagpala (Meeting of the Blessed People), 1932

Plays 

 Utos-Hari (King's Command), 1935, stage adaptation of Francisco's short story, Utos-Hari
 Ang Ikaapat na Mago (The Fourth Mage), 1942

References 

Tagalog-language writers
Filipino novelists
Filipino dramatists and playwrights
People from Bataan
1898 births
1980 deaths
20th-century novelists
20th-century dramatists and playwrights
20th-century male writers